Ruine Offenburg is a castle in Styria, Austria. Ruine Offenburg is situated at an elevation of 166 m.

See also
List of castles in Austria

References

This article was initially translated from the German Wikipedia.

Castles in Styria